Tukang Ojek Pengkolan popularly known as TOP: Tukang Ojek Pengkolan is an Indonesian television comedy series that airs on RCTI. It premiered on 25 April 2015 and ranked as the longest running Indonesian television series as completing 3000 episodes in 2021. Produced by Aris Nugraha under MNC Pictures, it starred Andri Sulistiandri, Eza Yayang, and Furry Setya Raharja.

Plot 
In a village in the Rawa Bebek area, behind Jakarta's office buildings, live a married couple named Rojak and Tati.

To earn a living, Rojak works as a motorcycle taxi driver based at the end of the entrance to the village. Together with two colleagues, Purnomo from Semarang and Sutisna from Sukabumi.

Cast 
 Andri Sulistiandri as Sutisna
 Eza Yayang as Rojak
 Furry Setya Raharja as Purnomo
 Ranty Purnamasari as Maesaroh
 Tengku Firmansyah as Ferdi
 Cindy Fatika Sari as Amirah
 Adhe Nurul as Uyuy
 Fairuz Aliya as Aliya
 Fitri Ayu as Yuli
 Otong Lalo as Babe Naim
 Kusye as Odih
 H. Suparman as Murod
 Fahmi Bo as Tajuddin
 Febry Khey as Surti
 Henry Chan as Bobby
 Johfi Syazeli as Faiz
 Nadya Ulya as Farhana
 Yudetra Atala Jinan as Fadhil
 Retno Soetarto as Murni
 Sopyan Dado as Sopyan
 Ika Kartika as Rahmawati
 Arifah Lubai as Karina
 Hamas Syahid as Fauzan
 Clara Kaizer as Bunga
 Ega Olivia as Sasi
 Fajar Gomez as Pandu
 Vanda Rainy as Rainy
 Ni Made Monica as Monica
 Natasha Rizka Sakila as Nina
 Gito Gilas as Danang
 Diar Hendryan as Rahayu
 Tanih Dugal as Bowo
 Hami Diah as Jubaedah
 Jonatan Alvaro as Roron
 Bogel Alkatiri as Indro
 Anastasja Rina as Wahyuni
 Arjuna Danis as Bagas
 Ahmad Satiri as Sodik
 Jhon Jawir as Sujono
 Cang Rusli as Kasman
 Sandi Mochin as Teddy
 Pandu Bone as Ocit
 Andrie Tawaqal as Jumbo
 Poppy Bunga as Popy
 Ahmad Januar as Anto
 Eca Yasmin as Yanti
 Rifki as Eko
 Naquita Aurora as Melati
 Stella Bodea as Romna
 Ade Herman as Deden
 Nadhea Ananda as Raya
 Ricky Perdana as Harun
 Kiki Kinanti as Serena
 Debby as Indah
 Nikita Becker as Rizma
 Ana Riana as Rinjani
 Ranty Maria as Ririn
 Michelle Wanda as Rachel
 Pengky Jo as Pengky
 Tuti Hestuti as Tuti
 Stefanus Tjiproet as Cipto
 Pisca Maharani as Lastri
 Humam Muhana as Yudistira
 Tika Bravani as Denok
 Fitrie Rachmadhina as Tati
 Leydia Asterina as Farida
 Davina Karamoy as Gisel
 Shareefa Daanish as Auliani
 Ayya Renita as Sekar
 Ponco Buwono as Firman
 Lulu Kurnia as Sari
 Tengku Syaira Anataya as Annisa
 Adhista Pujiama as Windy
 Sonia Alyssa as Bonita
 Afifah Ifah'nda as Zahra
 Yasamin Jasem as Selly
 Mat Rozi as Salim
 Sarah Tuffahati as April
 Putri Anne as Novita
 Gaby Marissa as Munaroh
 Renita Sukardi as Nurmala
 Ucok Baba as Sarmili
 Dimas Aditya as Wildan
 Anyun Cadel as Anyun
 Abenk Marco as Cecep
 Andrew Andika as Reza Ramadhan
 James Purba as Beni
 Erick Estrada as Norman
 Savira Crith as Aisyah
 Titi Kamal as Tika
 Arya Saloka as Deni
 Ridwan Hendra as Daus
 Tabah Penemuan as Patar Siregar
 Tissa Biani as Dinda
 Jaja Mihardja as Simin
 Piet Pagau as Herman
 Indra Birowo as Ramli
 Lulu Zakaria as Hayati
 Indra Brotolaras as Ramdan
 Dewi Octaviany as Laras
 Aldora Handoyo as Rani
 Enzy Storia as Sarah
 Pamela Bowie as Butet
 Ika Angel Hanika as Tiur
 Faradina Tika as Mimin
 Valeria Stahl Kaliey as Widya
 Rico Verald as Yadi
 Shandy Ishabella as Siska
 Fajar Khuto as Ujang
 Yunita Siregar as Asri
 Arbani Yasiz as Beben
 Asep Sunarya as Udin
 Indrayana as Titin
 Roy Marten as Edy
 Dewi Natalia as Monica
 Iga Azwika as Wulan
 Sandi Tile as Amin
 Titiek Sandhora as Nova
 Yati Octavia as Yati
 Pangky Suwito as Pangky / Wito
 Irsyadillah as Ridwan
 Rheiny Octavia as Linda
 Tora Sudiro as Opik
 Echa Oemry as Maya
 Silvia Anggraini as Susan
 Syahrudin Firdaos as Sapri
 Nayla Sandova as Husna
 Jerry as Jerry
 Kurnia Asmawati as Uun
 Melly Yan as Ayu
 Anton Qubro as Sugi
 Millenia as Olivia
 Obimesak as Wawang
 Shafa Afisah as Ambar
 Yuyun Shyfa as Nesti
 Tamee Irely as Vanessa
 Betran Rizki as Salman
 Moekti Halid as Aldo
 Imas Tamborin as Mumun
 Fenny Wijaya as Iyoh
 Evita as Chenchen
 Nabila Sudiro as Nana
 Sugeng Fadila as Makbul
 Dhony Fadli as Yusuf
 Aliyah Faizah as Lola
 Marchelinno as Raka
 Helene Sienca as Selvi
 Elsy Amalia as Ninu
 Syntia Fitriyani as Ani
 Aline Manza as Isaa
 Salshabilla Audita as Desi
 Nina Shaqi as Ratna
 Angel Hanika as Tiyur
 Paulina Silitonga as Citra
 Indri Mohana as Inneke
 Indyrach as Hani
 Pangeran Tyson as Joni
 Acit as Cimot
 Selvy Kanesya as Rika
 Desi Oktari as Tini
 Prita Purnamasari as Prita
 Sendra Hestiningrum as Lisa
 Neni Monru as Nia 
 Ryan Astrini as Gita
 Harry Al as Lukman
 Devicia Rossa as Bella
 Adzania Putri as Nia: Harun and Isaa's daughter
 Fhadil Firdaus as Budi
 Camelia Putri as Indri
 Eldania Zahra as Mita
 Angga Kim as Andre
 Kanaya Abigail as Siwi
 Emmie Lemu as Jamilah
 Rahman Kholic as Ronron
 Puput Azzy as Kokom
 Melsy Delsini as Jelita
 Izhar Bima as Surya
 Fandico as Hans
 Amaris Pulungan as Keiko
 Vania Valencia as Keiko's cousin
 Ryda as Heni
 Matahari Yusuf as Al
 Nisrina Cesa Fauziyyah as Agnez
 Erwin Cortez as Jamilah's husband
 Ali Zainal as Ali Zainal
 Evelina Witanama as Evelina Witanama

Productions

Casting 
Eza Yayang was roped in to play Rojak. In April 2016, Dewi Octaviany was chosen to play Laras. In December 2017, Tika Bravani to play the role of Denok.  In May 2018, Tora Sudiro's daughter named Nabila Sudiro enter the show as Nana. In October 2020, Tika Bravani playing Denok quit.

Filming 
On 29 December 2017 the show completed 1,000 episodes. The show completed 2,000 episodes on 24 September 2019.

As of 25 December 2019, this series has surpassed the number of episodes Tukang Bubur Naik Haji with 2,185 episodes. So that this series ranks first on the list of soap operas with the longest episodes in the history of Indonesian television. On 26 November 2021, This series is the first Indonesian soap opera to reach 3,000 episodes.

Reception 
In the first episode, is in seventh place with TVR 2.9 and audience share 14.3%.

In popular culture 
The clip from an episode where the lead character Purnomo (Furry Setya Raharja) say "I love you Nov, I have to see you happy, even though you are happy with other people, not with me." went viral due to Putri Anne, who plays Novita, is known to be asked by her mother to marry Radit. Novita was forced to leave Purnomo in confusion.

References

External links 
 
 
 
 

Indonesian drama television series
Indonesian television soap operas